Chandni Chowk metro station may refer to:

Chandni Chowk metro station, Delhi
Chandni Chowk metro station, Kolkata